George Jessel may refer to:

George Jessel (actor) (1898–1981), American actor
George Jessel (jurist) (1824–1883), English jurist
George Jessel of the Jessel Baronets